is the second album by Japanese novelty heavy metal band Animetal, released through Sony Records on February 21, 1998. The album consists of a non-stop marathon of metal covers of theme songs of tokusatsu series from the 1970s and 1980s. A karaoke version of this album was also released.

"Let's Go! Rider Kick," "Fight! Kamen Rider V3," "Setup! Kamen Rider X," "Amazon Rider Koko ni Ari," "Kamen Rider Stronger no Uta," and "Moero! Kamen Rider" were recorded separately as a marathon EP titled Tokusatsu de Ikou! Like the first marathon CD, some songs incorporate guitar riffs from well-known hard rock and heavy metal songs. Most notable is "Tatakae! Chōjin Bibyūn", which uses the guitar riff of Van Halen's "Ain't Talkin' 'Bout Love."

Animetal Marathon II includes a bonus disc containing the band's songs for the 1997 anime film Rurouni Kenshin: Ishin Shishi e no Chinkonka.

Track listing 
All tracks are arranged by Animetal.

Personnel
 - Lead vocals
 - Guitar, backing vocals ("Tetsujin Tiger Seven")
Masaki - Bass, backing vocals ("Tatakae! Chōjin Bibyūn")

with

Katsuji - Drums
Mie - Backing vocals on "Susume! Gorenger"

Footnotes

References

External links

1998 albums
Animetal albums
Japanese-language albums
Covers albums
Sony Music Entertainment Japan albums